Lakatos is a Hungarian surname (meaning locksmith), and may refer to:
 Brent Lakatos (born 1980), Canadian athlete
 Géza Lakatos, a Hungarian general during World War II; briefly served as Prime Minister of Hungary
 Imre Lakatos, a philosopher of mathematics and science
 Imre Schlosser-Lakatos, Hungarian footballer
 Josh Lakatos (born 1973), American target shooter
 Menyhért Lakatos Hungarian Romani writer
 Pál Lakatos, Hungarian boxer
 Roby Lakatos, a Romani violinist from Hungary

Hungarian-language surnames
Occupational surnames